Sheikh Jarrah is a predominantly Palestinian neighborhood in East Jerusalem,  north of the Old City, on the road to Mount Scopus. It received its name from the 13th-century tomb of Sheikh Jarrah, a physician of Saladin, located within its vicinity. The modern neighborhood was founded in 1865 and gradually became a residential center of Jerusalem's Muslim elite, particularly the al-Husayni family. After the 1948 Arab-Israeli War, it became under Jordanian-held East Jerusalem, bordering the no-man's land area with Israeli-held West Jerusalem until the neighborhood was occupied by Israel in the 1967 Six-Day War. Most of its present Palestinian population is said to come from refugees expelled from Jerusalem's Talbiya neighbourhood in 1948.

Certain properties are subject of legal proceedings based on the application of two Israeli laws, the Absentee Property Law and the Legal and Administrative Matters Law of 1970. Israeli nationalists have been working to replace the Palestinian population in the area since 1967. Over a period of five decades, a number of Israeli settlements have been built in and adjacent to Sheikh Jarrah.

History

Establishment in the 12th century
The Arab neighborhood of Sheikh Jarrah was originally a village named after Hussam al-Din al-Jarrahi, who lived in the 12th century and was an emir and the personal physician to Saladin, the military leader whose army liberated Jerusalem from the Crusaders. Sheikh Hussam received the title jarrah (جراح), meaning "healer" or "surgeon" in Arabic.

Sheikh Jarrah established a zawiya (literally "angle, corner", also meaning a small mosque or school), known as the Zawiya Jarrahiyya. Sheikh Jarrah was buried on the grounds of the school. A tomb was built in 1201, which became a destination for worshippers and visitors. A two-story stone building incorporating a flour mill, Qasr el-Amawi, was built opposite the tomb in the 17th century.

Development in the 19th century

The neighborhood Sheikh Jarrah was established on the slopes of Mount Scopus, taking its name from the tomb of Sheikh Jarrah. The initial residential construction works were commenced in 1865 by an important city notable, Rabah al-Husayni, who constructed a large manor among the olive groves near the Sheikh Jarrah tomb and outside the Damascus Gate. This action motivated many other Muslim notables from the Old City to migrate to the area and construct new homes, including the Nashashibis, built homes in the upscale northern and eastern parts of the neighborhood. Sheikh Jarrah began to grow as a Muslim nucleus between the 1870s and 1890s. Prayer at the Sheikh Jarrah tomb is said to bring good luck, particularly for those who raise chickens and eggs. It became the first Arab Muslim-majority neighborhood in Jerusalem to be built outside the walls of the Old City. In the western part, houses were smaller and more scattered.

Because it was founded by Rabah al-Husayni whose home formed the nucleus of Sheikh Jarrah, the neighborhood was locally referred to as the "Husayni Neighborhood." It gradually became a center for the notable al-Husayni family whose members, including Jerusalem mayor Salim al-Husayni and the former treasurer of the Education Ministry in the Ottoman capital of Istanbul, Shukri al-Husayni, built their residences in the neighborhood. Other notables who moved into the neighborhood included Faydi Efendi Shaykh Yunus, the Custodian of the Aqsa Mosque and the Dome of the Rock, and Rashid Efendi al-Nashashibi, a member of the District Administrative Council. A mosque housing the Sheikh Jarrah tomb was built in 1895 on Nablus Road, north of the Old City and the American Colony. In 1898 the Anglican St. George's School was built in Sheikh Jarrah and soon became the secondary educational institution where Jerusalem's elite sent their sons.

Population around 1900 
At the Ottoman census of 1905, the Sheikh Jarrah nahiya (sub-district) consisted of the Muslim quarters of Sheikh Jarrah, Hayy el-Husayni, Wadi el-Joz and Bab ez-Zahira, and the Jewish quarters of Shim'on Hatsadik and Nahalat Shim'on. Its population was counted as 167 Muslim families (est. 1,250 people), 97 Jewish families, and 6 Christian families. It contained the largest concentration of Muslims outside the Old City. Most of the Muslim population was born in Jerusalem, with 185 residents alone being members of the al-Husayni family. A smaller number hailed from other parts of Palestine, namely Hebron, Jabal Nablus and Ramla, and from other parts of the Ottoman Empire, including Damascus, Beirut, Libya and Anatolia. The Jewish population included Ashkenazim, Sephardim and Maghrebim while the Christians were mostly Protestants. In 1918 the Sheikh Jarrah quarter of the Sheikh Jarrah nahiya contained about 30 houses.

Jordanian and Israeli control

During the 1948 Arab–Israeli War, 14 April, 78 Jews, mostly doctors and nurses, were killed on their way to Hadassah Hospital when their convoy was attacked by Arab forces as it passed through Sheikh Jarrah, the main road to Mount Scopus. In the wake of these hostilities, Mount Scopus was cut off from what would become West Jerusalem. On 24 April the Haganah launched an attack on Sheikh Jarrah as part of Operation Yevusi but they were forced to retreat after action by the British Army.

From 1948, Sheikh Jarrah was on the edge of a UN-patrolled no-man's land between West Jerusalem and the Israeli enclave on Mount Scopus. A wall stretched from Sheikh Jarrah to Mandelbaum Gate, dividing the city. Before 1948, Jews had purchased property in the West Bank and Jordan later passed the Custodian of Enemy Property Law and set a Custodian of Enemy Property to administer the property, amounting to some 30,000 dunums or about 5 percent of the total area of the West Bank. In 1956, the Jordanian government moved 28 Palestinian families into Sheikh Jarrah who were displaced from their homes in Israeli-held Jerusalem during the 1948 War. This was done in accordance with a deal reached between Jordan and UNRWA which stipulated that the refugee status of the families would be renounced in exchange for titles for ownership of the new houses after three years of residency, but the exchange did not take place.

During the Six-Day War of 1967, Israel captured East Jerusalem, including Sheikh Jarrah. While discussing "The Legal and Administrative Matters Law of 1970" in the Knesset in 1968, The Minister of Justice stated that "if the Jordanian Custodian of Enemy Property in East Jerusalem sold a house to someone and received money, this house will not be returned”, implying that the deal with UNRWA would be respected.

Under international law, the area, effectively annexed by Israel, is a part of the occupied Palestinian territories. Israel applies its laws there and the legal proceedings in these and other similar cases in East Jerusalem, are based on the application of two Israeli laws, the Absentee Property Law and the Legal and Administrative Matters Law of 1970.

Jewish groups have sought to gain property in Sheikh Jarrah claiming they were once owned by Jews, including the Shepherd Hotel compound, the Mufti's Vineyard, the building of the el-Ma'amuniya school, the Simeon the Just/Shimon HaTzadik compound, and the Nahlat Shimon neighborhood.

In May 2021, clashes occurred between Palestinians and Israeli police over further anticipated evictions in Sheikh Jarrah.

Consulates and diplomatic missions
In the 1960s, many diplomatic missions and consulates opened in Sheikh Jarrah:
The British Consulate at 19 Nashashibi Street, the Turkish Consulate next door at 20 Nashashibi Street, the Belgian Consulate, the Swedish Consulate, the Spanish Consulate, and the UN mission at Saint George Street.

Tony Blair, former envoy of the Diplomatic Quartet, stays at the American Colony Hotel when visiting the region.

Transportation
The neighbourhood's main street, Nablus Road, was previously part of route 60. In the 1990s a new dual carriageway with two lanes in each direction and a separate bus lane was built west of the neighborhood. Tracks were laid in the busway which since 2010 form the Red Line of the Jerusalem Light Rail.

Landmarks

Shrines and tombs

The Jewish presence in Sheikh Jarrah centered on the tomb of Shimon HaTzadik, one of the last members of the Great Assembly, the governing body of the Jewish people after the Babylonian Exile. According to the Babylonian Talmud, Shimon HaTzadik met with Alexander the Great when the Macedonian army passed through the Land of Israel and convinced him not to destroy the Second Temple. For years Jews made pilgrimages to his tomb in Sheikh Jarrah, a practice documented in travel literature. In 1876, the cave and the adjoining land, planted with 80 ancient olive trees, were purchased by the Jews for 15,000 francs. Dozens of Jewish families built homes on the property. Other landmarks in Sheikh Jarrah are a medieval mosque dedicated to one of the soldiers of Saladin, St. George's Anglican Cathedral and the Tomb of the Kings.

St. John of Jerusalem Eye Hospital
The St John of Jerusalem Eye Hospital is an institution of The Order of St John that provides eye care in the West Bank, Gaza and East Jerusalem. Patients receive care regardless of race, religion or ability to pay. The hospital first opened in 1882 on Hebron Road opposite Mount Zion. The building in Sheikh Jarrah opened in 1960 on Nashashibi Street.

St. Joseph's French Hospital
The St. Joseph's French Hospital is situated across the street from St John of Jerusalem Eye Hospital and is run by a French Catholic charity. It is a 73-bed hospital with three main operating theaters, coronary care unit, X-ray, laboratory facilities, and outpatient clinic. Facilities in internal medicine, surgery, neurosurgery, E.N.T., pediatric surgery and orthopedics.

Shepherd Hotel

The Shepherd Hotel in Sheikh Jarrah was originally a villa built for the Grand Mufti of Jerusalem. The mufti, who never lived in it, transferred property rights to his personal secretary, George Antonius and his wife, Katy. After the death of George Antonius in 1942, his widow Katy invited many of Jerusalem's elite to her house, though only one Jew. While living in the house, Katy Antonius had a highly publicized affair with the commander of the British forces in Palestine, Evelyn Barker. In 1947, the Jewish underground Irgun blew up a house nearby. Antonius left the house, and a regiment of Scottish Highlanders was stationed there. After the 1948 war, it was taken over by the Jordanian authorities and turned into a pilgrim hotel. In 1985, it was bought by the American Jewish millionaire Irving Moskowitz and continued to operate as a hotel, renamed the Shefer Hotel. The Israeli border police used it as base for several years. In 2007, when Moskowitz initiated plans to build 122 apartments on the site of the hotel, the work was condemned by the British government. In 2009 the plan was modified, but was still condemned by the U.S. and UK governments, Permission to build 20 apartments near the hotel was given in 2009, and formal approval was announced by the Jerusalem municipality on March 23, 2010, hours before Prime Minister Benjamin Netanyahu met with President Barack Obama. Haaretz reported that, "an existing structure in the area will be torn down to make room for the housing units, while the historic Shepherd Hotel will remain intact. A three-story parking structure and an access road will also be constructed on site." The hotel was finally demolished on January 9, 2011.

Impact
Sheikh Jarrah is the subject of the 2012 documentary My Neighbourhood, co-directed by Julia Bacha and Rebekah Wingert-Jabi and co-produced by Just Vision and Al Jazeerah.

Notable people

 George Antonius
 Kai Bird
 Mohammed El-Kurd
 Yonatan Yosef, Israeli rabbi

Gallery

References

Bibliography

Yitzhak Reiter, Lior Lehrs (2010). The Sheikh Jarrah Affair: The Strategic Implications of Jewish Settlement in an Arab Neighborhood in East Jerusalem ,  JIIS Studies Series no. 404. The Jerusalem Institute for Israel Studies; On  .

External links
 

 
Populated places established in 1865
1865 establishments in the Ottoman Empire
Arab neighborhoods in Jerusalem
Arab–Israeli conflict
East Jerusalem